The Hunter of Fall (German: Der Jäger von Fall) is a 1926 German silent drama film directed by Franz Seitz and starring Grete Reinwald, William Dieterle and Fritz Kampers. It is based on a novel of the same title by Ludwig Ganghofer which has been made into films several times.

It was made at the Emelka Studios in Munich. The film's sets were designed by Ludwig Reiber.

Cast
 Grete Reinwald 
 William Dieterle 
 Fritz Kampers
 Ferdinand Martini 
 Kaethe Consee
 Theodor Autzinger
 Julius Stettner

References

Bibliography
 Astrid Pellengahr & Anja Ballis. Kehrseite eines Klischees: der Schriftsteller Ludwig Ganghofer. Bauer-Verlag, 2005.

External links

1926 films
Films of the Weimar Republic
German silent feature films
Films directed by Franz Seitz
Remakes of German films
Films based on The Hunter of Fall
German black-and-white films
German drama films
1926 drama films
Bavaria Film films
Films shot at Bavaria Studios
Silent drama films
1920s German films
1920s German-language films